"23" is a song by American country music singer Sam Hunt. It was released on September 9, 2021, as the lead single from his upcoming third studio album. Hunt wrote the song with Shane McAnally, Chris LaCorte, and Josh Osborne, while it was produced by Chris LaCorte.

Background
In July 2020, Hunt shared an acoustic performance video of the track on Instagram, which was later aired as part of the 2020 Highway Finds Fest the same month. Lauren Jo Black of Country Now called the song "nostalgic" about a prior relationship Hunt was in, in which he "fondly reminisc[es] on all of the memories he shared with an ex lover. And although they've moved on from each other, he admits he still cherishes the times they shared together".

Composition
Tom Roland of Billboard noted that the song uses "only two chords" in contrast to country music's three-chord norm, alternating "between a pair of major seventh chords, a four-note construct with one extra note that's only a half step below the root".

Cover art
The photograph used is an early photo of Hunt's wife's aunt and uncle when they were a young couple.

Music video
The music video was released on October 1, 2021, and directed by Tim Mattia. According to Chris Parton of Sounds Like Nashville, the video features three characters: "a single mom who dreams of carefree freedom, an old man who longs for a fast horse and the open range, or a woman still holding on to that 23-year-old summer". The video shows them each using a virtual reality headset to "relive their most treasured memories".

Charts

Weekly charts

Year-end charts

References

2021 singles
2021 songs
Sam Hunt songs
Songs about nostalgia
Songs written by Sam Hunt
Songs written by Shane McAnally
Songs written by Josh Osborne
MCA Nashville Records singles